Pankan (also Romanized as Pankān) is a village in Halil Rural District, in the Central District of Jiroft County, Kerman Province, Iran. At the 2006 census, its population was 13, in 6 families.

References 

Populated places in Jiroft County